The Tavern is located at 105 Riverside Dr. in Eufaula, Alabama.  It was designed by Edward Williams, and built in 1836.  The Tavern was added to the National Register of Historic Places in 1970.

References

National Register of Historic Places in Barbour County, Alabama
Houses on the National Register of Historic Places in Alabama
Houses completed in 1836
Houses in Barbour County, Alabama